Julie Krasniak (born 5 June 1988) is a French racing cyclist. She finished in second place at the French national road race in 2012.

References

External links
 

1988 births
Living people
French female cyclists
Sportspeople from Moselle (department)
Mediterranean Games silver medalists for France
Mediterranean Games medalists in cycling
Competitors at the 2009 Mediterranean Games
Cyclists from Grand Est